John Greig Williamson (born 28 December 1968 in Glasgow) is a Scottish cricketer. He is a right-handed batsman and a right-arm medium-pace bowler.

Having won his first cap in 1989, Williamson has played two One Day Internationals and has also played in the ICC Trophy for eight years, since 1997, having won the accolade of being one of Scotland's "Cricketers of the year" in 1996. He was also the first person to reach 150 caps for Scotland across all formats. Williamson is a qualified solicitor.

References

1968 births
Cricketers at the 1998 Commonwealth Games
Living people
Scotland One Day International cricketers
Scottish cricketers
Cricketers from Glasgow
Commonwealth Games competitors for Scotland